Jogwa - The Awakening is a 2009 Marathi-language film directed by Rajiv Patil and produced under iDream Productions & Screenplay by Sanjay Krishnaji Patil. It stars Upendra Limaye and Mukta Barve while Priya Berde, Vinay Apte, Sharvani Pillai and Kishor Kadam essay supporting roles.

The film received five awards at the national film awards for 2008. National Film Award for Best Film on Social Issues, National Film Award for Best Actor for Uupendra Limaye, National Film Award for Best Music Direction for Ajay Atul, National Film Award for Best Male Playback Singer for Hariharan for song "Jeev Rangla" and National Film Award for Best Female Playback Singer for Shreya Ghoshal for the same song.

It contains strong romantic elements, that explores the life of a rural people from Maharashtra who are the devotees of Goddess Yellamma, known as "Jogtin" (female) and "Jogta" (male) and are treated as slaves viewed with a mixture of semi-respect.

Jogwa actually means alms given to a person, usually known as a Jogta or a Jogtin. They are forced by the society to give up everything and serve God. A jogta has to give up the fact of being a man and suppress all his desires. A jogtin is expected to give up herself, she cannot get married, have children or have a life of her own.

This tradition was followed in the rural areas in the ancient times and like any tradition was flexible enough for those in power to misuse it. It is known to be still followed in some villages in Karnataka. Jogwa is a love story between jogta played by Upendra Limaye and jogtin played by Mukta Barve.

A heart wrenching tale that exposes the hypocrisies and exploitations of an oppressed society harrowed by archaic traditions and plagued by superstitions in the heart of rural India, Jogwa is a poignant tale of one woman’s inspiring journey to break free from the shackles of discrimination, sexual oppression and servitude and find true happiness.

On the centenary of Indian cinema in April 2013, Forbes included Upendra Limaye's performance in the film on its list, "25 Greatest Acting Performances of Indian Cinema".

Cast 

 Upendra Limaye as Tayappa
 Mukta Barve as Suli
Kishor Kadam as Yamnya
Vinay Apte as Basappa
Anand Alkunte as Mharatya
Anita Date-Kelkar as Sakhu
Priya Arun as Shevantakka
Amita Khopkar as Akkubai
Pramod Pawar as Subana
Vidya Karanjikar as Bayja
Aditi Deshpande as Taanu
Vijay Salve as Mhadu
Rajan Gavas as More Sir
Prashan Patil as Annu
Sharvani Pillai as Parvvaa
Smita Tambe as Fula
Chinmay Mandlekar as Sakhya Patil
Milind Oak as Pujari

Critical reception

Film is already internationally acclaimed, praised by critics and audience alike and won awards like Best Director Award, three prominent awards, 12 nominations in various categories at the Zee Gaurav Award 2009 along with 13 nominations for depiction of culture and society and First Special Jury Award and Audience Choice Award at the Pune International Film Festival.

Music 

The Marathi music duo Ajay–Atul composed varied compositions including Romantic and traditional Gondhal. The song Jeev Rangla was awarded a National Film Award in 2010.

Awards
 Got 37 Awards out of 60 Nominations before its commercial release.
 Zee Gaurav Award 2009 Got 12 Nominations.
 Maharashtra State Government Awards for Best Film, Best Director, Best Actor & Best Actress.
 V. Shantaram Awards for Best Film.
 Sanskruti Kala Darpan Awards for Best Film.
 Maharashtra Times Awards for Best Film.
 International Film  Festival,Pune Awards For Best Film.
Marathi International Film & Theater Awards- Best lyricist - Sanjay Patil
Marathi International Film & Theater Awards- Best Cinematography - Sanjay Jadhav

References

External links 
 
 
 

Films featuring a Best Actor National Award-winning performance
Films scored by Ajay–Atul
Best Film on Other Social Issues National Film Award winners
2009 films
2000s Marathi-language films